Muhammad Akram Ghanimat Shah Kunjahi (b. Kunjah, d. c. 1695 CE) was a Persian-language poet And Sufi in the Mughal Empire.
The shrine of Hadrat Ghanimat Kunjahi, a Sufi poet of Persian at Kunjah, District Gujrat, Punjab, Pakistan. He belonged to the Banu Hashim family of the Prophet (peace be upon him) and was a descendant of Hazrat Ali (R.A) His Family Also Known As (Mufti Family) & One of his ancestors was Ali's son Imam Abu al-Qasim Muhammad bin Hanffiyah (Alvi.Hashmi),His ancestors, Mir Syed Ali, migrated from Iran and came to the subcontinent with King Humayun but he used the Kunjahi name in the first half of the seventeenth century CE.

Life

Most of Kunjahi's life was spent in and around his native village. He traveled to, and stayed in, Kashmir, Delhi and Lahore. He was an adherent of the Ḳādiriyya, a Sufi order.

Works

Kunjahi wrote in Persian, in the style known as sabk-i hindī, the so-called 'Indian style'. This style was characterised by an enthusiasm for the ghazal form; an increased interest in realistic images, often in erotic themes; conceptual complexity of images and themes; and complex syntax. It has been suggested that Kunjahi's 'fondness for lengthy compound expressions echoes the enormous compound epithets of Sanskrit poetry of the Kāvya style, especially as Ghanīmat’s century was one of considerable Muslim-Hindu cultural interaction, in which, for instance, several Sanskrit works were translated into Persian at the Mughal court'.

Kunjahi's diwan is dominated by ghazals, including a poem of praise, Aurangzeb, along with the Nayrang-i ʿishḳ ('Talisman of Love'), from 1681 CE. This is a sentimental, sensuous romantic poem in mathnawī form , set in the India of Kunjahi's day, characterized by 'mystical and symbolical overtones'.

Reception

The Nayrang-i ʿishḳ was translated into Pashto around 1600 by ʿAbd al-Hamīd Mohmand.

By the mid-twentieth century, Kunjahi had 'come to maintain a dim afterlife in popular local memory only as a miracle worker with some notable but minor specialist powers of the kind attributed to the lesser sort of departed Sufi saint, all over the Muslim world'. His tomb was associated with improving mental faculties, curing insanity and helping aspiring poets.

Kunjahi gave his name to the Bazm-i-Ghanimat, a Pakistani literary organization. By his own request, the Pakistani poet Shareef Kunjahi (1914–2007) was interred in the compound of Kunjahi's mazar in Kunjah.

Studies

 A. Bausani, 'Indian Elements in the Indo-Persian Poetry: The Style of Ganimat Kunǧāhī', in Orientalia hispanica sive studia F.M. Pareja octogenario dicata, ed. by J.M. Barral, Arabica-Islamica, 1 (Leiden 1974), pp. 105–19.
 
 Arun Singh, Black Light: Islamic Philosophical Themes from the Nayrang-e ‘Ishq (London: Buzurg Omid, 2013)n: Lewisohn, Leonard, (ed.), The Heritage of Sufism: III. Late Classical Persianate Sufism (1501 - 1750). Oxford: Oneworld Publications, pp. 435–463.

Editions

 Dīwān, ed. Ghulām Rabbānī ʿAzīz (Lahore 1958)
 Nayrang-i ʿishk, ed. Ghulām Rabbānī ʿAzīz (Lahore: Panjabi Adabi Akademi, 1962)

References

1695 deaths
Persian-language poets
People from Gujrat District
Mughal Empire poets